Kris Tschetter (born December 30, 1964) is an American professional golfer, who played on the LPGA Tour.

Amateur career
Tschetter was born in Detroit, Michigan. As an amateur, she won the 1983 American Junior Golf Association Tournament of Champions and was a four-time winner of the South Dakota State Women's Amateur Championship (1983–86). In 1984, she qualified for the U.S. Women's Open and the following year was a quarterfinalist at the Trans-National.

Tschetter attended Texas Christian University graduating in 1987 as a Radio, Television and Film Major. She was a three-time member of the All-Southwest Conference Team.

Tschetter, as a freshman, was a member of Shady Oaks Golf Club in Fort Worth where she developed a relationship with the late Ben Hogan. Tschetter one day convinced Hogan to play nine holes of golf with two of her teammates from TCU. He duck-hooked the first tee shot but finished at even par. This, according to Tschetter, is the last time that Hogan ever played golf. They remained friends until his death in 1997. Tschetter has written a book called Mr. Hogan, the Man I Knew: An LPGA Player Looks Back on an Amazing Friendship and Lessons She Learned from Golf's Greatest Legend recounting her times with Hogan.

Professional career
Tschetter turned pro in 1988. In 1992, she won her only LPGA event. She won the Northgate Computer Classic by three shots over Deb Richard. Tschetter also took part in a playoff at the 1997 State Farm Rail Classic . She and Lori Kane losing to Cindy Figg-Currier on the first hole of sudden death.

Tschetter twice finished second in major championships. The first of which was the 1996 U.S. Women's Open, where she finished six shots behind Annika Sörenstam. At the 1997 Nabisco Dinah Shore, Tschetter finished two strokes behind Betsy King.

Personal life
Tschetter was married to Kirk Lucas, her coach, and they have two daughters, Lainey and Kyra.

She founded the Kris Tschetter Celebrity Golf Benefit for Kids in 1991, an event that raises money for children’s charities in the Sioux Falls, South Dakota area. While on Tour, she has represented the Liz Claiborne clothing for 11 straight years and since its inception in 1999, Private Club Links.

Professional wins

LPGA Tour wins (1)

LPGA Tour playoff record (0–1)

Other wins (1)
1991 JCPenney Classic (with Billy Andrade)

Legends Tour wins (1)
2015 Walgreens Charity Classic

Results in LPGA majors

^ The Women's British Open replaced the du Maurier Classic as an LPGA major in 2001.

WD = withdrew
CUT = missed the halfway cut
"T" = tied

Summary
Starts – 64
Wins – 0
2nd-place finishes – 2
3rd-place finishes – 0
Top 3 finishes – 2
Top 5 finishes – 2
Top 10 finishes – 4
Top 25 finishes – 16
Missed cuts – 21
Most consecutive cuts made – 9
Longest streak of top-10s – 1

U.S. national team appearances
Professional
Handa Cup: 2015 (winners)

References

External links

Golf Podium
Golf Profile at CBS Sportsline

American female golfers
TCU Horned Frogs women's golfers
LPGA Tour golfers
Golfers from Detroit
1964 births
Living people